Norbert Fehr (born 25 May 1937) is a German weightlifter. He competed in the men's middle heavyweight event at the 1964 Summer Olympics.

References

External links
 

1937 births
Living people
German male weightlifters
Olympic weightlifters of the United Team of Germany
Weightlifters at the 1964 Summer Olympics
Sportspeople from Ludwigshafen
20th-century German people